2,5-Dimethoxy-4-isopropylamphetamine (also known as DOiP and DOiPr) is a psychedelic drug of the phenethylamine and amphetamine chemical classes. It was first synthesized by Alexander Shulgin, and was described in his book PiHKAL (Phenethylamines i Have Known And Loved). Shulgin described DOiPR as being at least an order of magnitude weaker than DOPr, with doses of 20–30 mg required to produce valid changes in mental state.
Very little data exists about the pharmacological properties, metabolism, and toxicity of DOiPR.

See also 
 2C-iP
 2C-T-4
 DOx

References 

Substituted amphetamines
Designer drugs
Serotonin receptor agonists
Isopropyl compounds
2,5-Dimethoxyphenethylamines